In the Name of Love is the first album of StarStruck finalist Yasmien Kurdi. It was released on GMA Records. In 2006, the repackaged version of the album were released.

Track listing

In the Name of Love (repackaged) AVCD format

Personnel

 Buddy C. Medina - executive producer
 Freddie Saturno - album supervising producer
 Kedy Sanchez - album supervising producer
 Rene A. Salta - in charge of marketing
 Dominic Benedicto - mix engineering
 Nikki Cunanan - mix engineering
 Arnold Jallores - mix engineering
 Jimmy Antiporda - mix engineering
 Tris Suguita - mix engineering
 Joseph de Vera - cover design
 Jason Tablante - cover photography
 Jenjen Cabriana of Bambbi Fuentes Salon - make-up & hair

See also
GMA Records
GMA Network

References

External links
"Yasmien: In the Name of Love" album site

2005 debut albums
Yasmien Kurdi albums
GMA Music albums